Pakistani comics are comics or graphic novels originating from Pakistan. It have been started publishing from long time and Pakistani comics creators have gone to produce influential work in the comics industry.

History
After independence, comics are only used for politics and social issues. There was no professional comic artist but cartoonists started making it for newspaper articles.

In 21st century, artists started creating comic books. Some new characters and superheroes arose.

Pakistani comic book publishers
Pakistani notable comic book illustrators and publishers:

Nigar Nazar
Farooq Qaiser
Jawed Iqbal
Sabir Nazar
Yusuf Lodhi

Books

Events
Karachi Comic Con
Comic Con PK
ComicCon Lahore
TwinCon

External Links

See also
 Pakistani art
 List of Pakistani artists

References

Pakistani comics
Pakistani art